Auckland GAA (AGAA) was established in 1975. It is the ruling body for Gaelic football and hurling in the Auckland region of New Zealand.

The AGAA runs both Men's and Women's Football matches over the summer at Seddon Fields in Auckland. The competition was previously played over winter, however clashes with other sports deemed it necessary to move to a summer competition to attract more players.

Clubs
Current clubs
St Pats Emerald City
Celtic
Gaels GFC
Harps GFC
Marist Rangers

Previous clubs
Dale Paddy's GFC
Harps Rebels
Hutt Valley
Kitty O'Shea's
Marist Gaels
Molly Malones
Connemara Gaels

See also

Canterbury GAA
Wellington GAA

References

External links

1975 establishments in New Zealand
Australasia GAA
Gaelic games in New Zealand
Sports governing bodies in New Zealand
Sport in Auckland
Sports organizations established in 1975